The Mack Granite is a series of heavy duty (Class 8) and severe service trucks built by Mack Trucks. It has a long, low-profile hood and a high-visibility cab. Designed as straight trucks for local construction, waste removal, and other vocational jobs, it is also available as a semi-tractor. Introduced in 2001, it remains in production as of 2022.

Design 
The Granite is a long-hood conventional. It measures 117.5 from the bumper to the back of the cab. Designed for local use it usually has a day-cab but a 36" integral sleeper is available. Commonly a 6x4 (3 axles, 2 powered) there are packages from 4x2 (2 axles, 1 powered) to 8x6 (4 axles, 3 powered) and can be fitted with driven front, tandem-steer, lift, and extended trailing axles.

Advanced electronics are used for engine, chassis, and body controls, as well as maintenance. All trucks have ABS.

In 2019 a new generation Bendix Wingman Fusion was available in the Anthem. It uses radar and cameras to provide emergency braking, lane departure, and blind spot warnings.

Mack builds their own major components (engines, transmissions, axles, and suspensions) and the Granite has specific packages for different applications. Most vendor components are also available but engine choice is very limited.

Engines 
The Granite is available with two Mack diesels, a Cummins diesel, and a Cummins Westport natural gas engine. Between 2001 and 2005 an earlier generation Mack diesel was used.

The Mack MP7 is the base engine in the Granite. It is a  overhead cam turbocharged inline six-cylinder diesel engine. It was introduced in December 2006.

The Mack MP8 is the largest engine in the Granite. It is a  overhead cam turbocharged inline six-cylinder engine. It has been in production since 2007.

The Cummins ISL9 used in the Granite MHD when lower overall weight is more important than power. It is a  turbocharged inline six-cylinder engine.

The Cummins Westport L9N is a  turbocharged inline six-cylinder natural gas engine.

The Mack E7 AMI series was used in the Granite between 2001 and 2005. It is a  turbocharged inline six-cylinder engine.

Transmissions 
Both Mack and Eaton-Fuller have manual and automated shifting models. Manual transmissions have five or six main gears, extra ratios are made with different combinations of ranges. Allison transmissions are fully automatic.

Mack mDRIVE automated manual is the Granite's base transmission. It has no clutch pedal and shifts itself on demand. The driver can override it but it is normally driven in "D". It can have 12, 13, or 14-speeds. Other Mack manual transmissions have from 8- to 18-speeds.

Eaton-Fuller UltraShift automated shifting systems are available on all of  their transmissions from 9- to 18-speeds.

Allison RDS series 5- or 6-speed transmissions are available. The RDS is a fully automatic planetary gear transmission with a lock-up torque converter.

Frame 
A ladder frame with beam axles is used. Normally there is a single undriven front axle on semi-elliptical leaf springs, but driven and tandem steer (popular in Canada) axles are available. The base rear suspension is a Mack tandem (two powered axles). Granites are also available with single and tridem (three driven) axles, different axle/suspension combination types. Lift axles can be installed by either Mack or bodybuilders. Up to three axles can be driven. Wheelbases are from 

A set-forward or set-back front axle is offered. A set forward axle, with the tires immediately behind a straight bumper, is used when overall length is limited or when wheelbase has to be as long as possible for bridge-formula laws. Set back axles, where the hood extends in front of the axle, are used when maneuverability is more important than length or weight distribution.

In 2020 Mack introduced the Command Steer system. An additional on-demand electric power steering pump is operated electronically. This allows easier steering, will help dampen steering feedback, steady driving, and can compensate for side-winds, uneven pavement, and braking on different surfaces. A very light feel and automatic return-to-center feature are useful off-road, at slow speed, and in backing.

Dana-Spicer and Meritor supply air brakes, driveshafts, and other components.

Axles and suspensions 

Multi-leaf leaf springs are base, tapered leaves are optional.

Mack powered axles have the drive carrier on top of the housing. This lets the driveshafts be in line from the transmission to and between the axles at a higher level above the ground. With the higher level above the ground the driveshafts and u-joints are less prone to dirt and damage, important in on/off road construction.

Other powered axles are available from Dana-Spicer and Meritor. These have front mounted carriers and in tandems the two axle housings are different.

The Camelback tandem is the base rear suspension. The Camelback has multiple leaves that rock above the bogey pivot then curve down and under the axles. It is strong in on/off-road service.

The mRIDE tandem has tapered leaves that rock above the bogey pivot then go out and above the axles. Struts go from the bottom of the bogey pivot out and under the axle. They have more wheel travel and ground clearance than the camelback.

The Twin Y air suspension has trailing arms that fork to the rear and attach to both the top and bottom of the axle. There is an air bag behind the axle on each side and each axle is sprung individually.

Walking beams have low bogie pivots with a balance beam going out and under the axles. Any suspension is above the bogey pivot. They can have leaf springs, rubber load cushions, air bags, or be solidly mounted. Walking beams are very stable at low speeds and when stopped. Mack and Hendrickson models are available.

Applications 
Mack has standard packages for dump, concrete mixer, roll-off(hooklift), and rear loader bodies, as well as semi-tractor. Other packages can be special ordered.

Construction 
The Granite, with its extra heavy-duty chassis, high ground clearance, and high-visibility cab, was designed to be operated on construction" job sites".

Dump trucks are the first standard packages. Typically 6x4 (three axles, two driven) lift axles are available. Body builders can add lift axles and extended trailing axles for higher weights.

Concrete mixers are operated on/off-road locally at high weights.  Available driven front axles are often used on mixers. Mixers often can benefit from a set forward front axle and extended trailing axle for increased bridge formula weights.

Other types like flatbeds, including those that self-unload by dumping or with their own crane, Volumetric concrete mixers, and cranes can use the strong chassis.

Refuse 

Refuse is largely on-road use and doesn't need as much power as off-road use. Mack suggests that the Granite MHD with the lighter and less-powerful Cummins ISL9 engines be used.

Roll-off container trucks have a container that is raised in the front and slides off the back of the truck onto the ground. When a loaded box is carried it can be unloaded like a dump truck. They commonly haul construction debris but refuse containers are also left at commercial sites.

Rear-loading compactor bodies have a large hopper on the rear end. Typically a rear crew can load loose material, bins with assist, oversize pieces, and small containers. They are used for residential and light commercial pickup.

Semi-tractor 
There are semi-tractor packages but the Granite was designed primarily as a straight truck.

Snow plowing 

In the northern United States snow-plowing is a severe service that the Granite is suited for. The Granite has high ground clearances as designed, Mack has an increased frame height option to give under-truck blades even more clearance. Reinforced front frame rail extensions are available. A number of cold-weather options include heated windshield, windows, mirrors, and mechanical components.

Other uses 
The Granite can also be built to custom designs for most local heavy-duty applications. Vocational, utility, heavy delivery, any application that needs a strong chassis.

Gallery

References

External links 

  Mack index page with links at TrucksPlanet.com
  Mack Granite product page

Granite
Class 8 trucks
Vehicles introduced in 2001